The Paraná-Etendeka traps (or Paraná and Etendeka Plateau; or Paraná and Etendeka Province) comprise a large igneous province that includes both the main Paraná traps (in Paraná Basin, a South American geological basin) as well as the smaller severed portions of the flood basalts at the Etendeka traps (in northwest Namibia and southwest Angola). The original basalt flows occurred 138 to 128 million years ago.

Geodynamics 
The basalt samples at Paraná and Etendeka have an age of about 132 Ma, during the Valanginian stage of the Early Cretaceous. Indirectly, the rifting and extension are probably the origin of the Paraná and Etendeka traps and it could be the origin of the Gough and Tristan da Cunha Islands as well, as they are connected by the Walvis Ridge (Gough/Tristan hotspot). The seamounts of the Rio Grande Rise (25°S to 35°S) that go eastwards from the Paraná side are part of this traps system.

Description 
Interpretations of geochemistry, including isotopes, have led geologists to conclude that the magmas forming the traps and associated igneous rocks originated by melting of asthenosphic mantle due to the arrival of a mantle plume to the base of Earth's lithosphere. Then much of the magma was contaminated with crustal materials prior to their eruption. Some plutonic rocks related to the traps escaped crustal contamination reflecting more directly the source of the magmas in the mantle.

A type of rock called ignimbrite is found in some parts of the traps indicating explosive volcanic activity. The Paraná Traps possibly contains the site of the single largest explosive volcanic eruption known in Earth's history.

See also 
 Geology of Paraguay
 Geology of Uruguay
 Paraná Basin
 Uruguayan dyke swarms

References

Further reading

External links 
 

Large igneous provinces
 
Barremian Stage
Hauterivian Stage
Valanginian Stage
Early Cretaceous Africa
Early Cretaceous South America
Cretaceous volcanism
Volcanism of Brazil
Volcanism of Angola
Volcanism of Namibia
Cretaceous Argentina
Geology of Argentina
Cretaceous Brazil
Geology of Brazil
Cretaceous Uruguay
Geology of Uruguay
Stratigraphy of Argentina
Stratigraphy of Uruguay